The 2006–07 Florida Panthers season began on October 6 with a game at the BankAtlantic Center against the Boston Bruins. It was the Panthers' 14th season in the National Hockey League (NHL).

Regular season
The Panthers finished the regular season with the fewest power-play opportunities for with 337.

Season standings

Schedule and results

Playoffs
The Panthers failed to qualify for the playoffs for the sixth consecutive season. They last made the playoffs in 2000.

Player statistics

Transactions

Trades

Free agents acquired

Free agents lost

Draft picks
Florida's picks at the 2006 NHL Entry Draft in Vancouver, British Columbia.

References

 Game log: Florida Panthers game log on espn.com
 Team standings: NHL standings on espn.com
 Player Stats: Florida Panthers 2006–07 Reg. Season Stats on espn.com
 Draft picks: 2006 NHL Entry Draft

External links
 Official site of the Florida Panthers

Flo
Flo
Florida Panthers seasons
Florida Panthers
Florida Panthers